Group Portrait is a compilation album by the American band Chicago, released in 1991 by Columbia Records and Legacy Recordings originally, later reissued on the band's Chicago Records label. It includes hits and album cuts from the band's first fourteen albums along with rare tracks.

Group Portrait bears notable differences from most of the band's other official compilation and live albums including the following: it is not assigned a number in the album title number sequence; its cover art depicts people instead of just a logo art concept; and it includes commentary from band members James Pankow, Robert Lamm, former members Peter Cetera, Walt Parazaider and producer James William Guercio. Unlike the 2003 anthology The Box released later, this collection only covers their tenure with Columbia Records, and does not include Warner Bros. material. Also, only full-length versions of songs are included

Recording, production
According to reviewer Byron Mucklow, no remixing was done for this compilation; the material was digitally remastered from the master tapes. He describes the sound as "clear and punchy".

Critical reception
Rock music critic Bill Wyman wrote a generally dismissive review of Group Portrait, for the Chicago Reader,  calling it "an altogether fitting testament to Chicago's hippie self-absorption and dopey excesses." He called Chicago "probably the most unforgivably terrible rock 'n' roll band of the 70s" and said Group Portrait memorialized the band "in suitably monstrous fashion". He goes on to say that Chicago had some "decent" singles, already collected on two greatest-hits albums, and names "Wishing You Were Here" as the group's "most notable performance". In his opinion much of the lesser-known material included on Group Portrait belongs in "the nether reaches of our subconscious."

In The Detroit News and Free Press, on the other hand, Group Portrait was faulted for not including more of Chicago's less popular tracks, saying it only "[dipped] a toenail into the vaults", and calling it "a comprehensive if conservative retrospective." Group Portrait merited five out of a possible eight eighth notes on the paper's rating scale – not essential listening, but recommended for fans of the group.

Track listing (US)

References

1991 greatest hits albums
Chicago (band) compilation albums